Dendrelaphis is a genus of colubrid snakes, distributed from Pakistan, India and southern China to Indonesia, Timor-Leste, the Philippines, Australia, New Guinea and the Solomon Islands. There are over forty described species. Asian species are known commonly as bronzebacks, while the Australo-Papuan species are simply called treesnakes. All are non-venomous and entirely harmless to humans.

Classification
This list is based on the latest checklist of snakes in the world and recent revisions and descriptions published in the scientific literature.
 
The authors of a 2015 revision of the Australo-Papuan Dendrelaphis species recommended the synonymy of D. solomonis within D. calligaster, the elevation of D. keiensis to species status, the resurrection of D. lineolatus from within D. calligaster, and the resurrection of D. macrops and elevation of D. striolatus from within D. punctulatus. They also confined D. punctulatus to Australia and D. papuensis to the Trobriand Islands of Papua New Guinea.

Dendrelaphis andamanensis  – Andaman bronzeback
Dendrelaphis ashoki  – Ashok's bronzeback
Dendrelaphis bifrenalis , Boulenger's bronzeback – southern India and Sri Lanka
Dendrelaphis biloreatus  – Gore's bronzeback
Dendrelaphis calligaster  – northern treesnake, green treesnake, coconut treesnake
Dendrelaphis caudolineatus  – striped bronzeback
Dendrelaphis caudolineolatus  
Dendrelaphis chairecacos  – Karnataka bronzeback
Dendrelaphis cyanochloris  – blue bronzeback
Dendrelaphis flavescens  – Sulu bronzeback
Dendrelaphis formosus  – elegant bronzeback
Dendrelaphis fuliginosus  – Negros bronzeback
Dendrelaphis gastrostictus  – spot-bellied treesnake, montane treesnake
Dendrelaphis girii  – Giri's bronzeback
Dendrelaphis grandoculis  – southern bronzeback
Dendrelaphis grismeri  – Grismer's bronzeback
Dendrelaphis haasi  – Haas's bronzeback
Dendrelaphis hollinrakei  – Shek Kwu Chau island tree snake
Dendrelaphis humayuni  – Nicobar bronzeback
Dendrelaphis keiensis  – Kei Islands bronzeback
Dendrelaphis kopsteini  – Kopstein's bronzeback
Dendrelaphis inornatus  – Lesser Sunda bronzeback
Dendrelaphis levitoni  – Palawan bronzeback
Dendrelaphis lineolatus 
Dendrelaphis lorentzii  – Lorentz River treesnake
Dendrelaphis luzonensis  – Luzon bronzeback
Dendrelaphis macrops  – big-eyed treesnake 
Dendrelaphis marenae  – Maren Gaulke's bronzeback
Dendrelaphis modestus  – Moluccan bronzeback, grey bronzeback, striped bronzeback
Dendrelaphis ngansonensis  – Ngan Son bronzeback
Dendrelaphis nigroserratus  – sawtooth-necked bronzeback
Dendrelaphis oliveri  – Oliver's bronzeback
Dendrelaphis papuensis  – Trobriand Islands treesnake
Dendrelaphis philippiensis  – Philippine bronzeback
Dendrelaphis pictus  – painted bronzeback, common bronzeback
Dendrelaphis proarchos 
Dendrelaphis punctulatus  – common treesnake, Australian treesnake
Dendrelaphis schokari  – Schokar's bronzeback
Dendrelaphis sinharajensis  – Sinharaja tree snake
Dendrelaphis striatus  – striped bronzeback
Dendrelaphis striolatus  – Palau treesnake
Dendrelaphis subocularis  – mountain bronzeback, Burmese bronzeback  
Dendrelaphis terrificus  – Sulawesi bronzeback, terrific bronzeback
Dendrelaphis tristis  – common  bronzeback, Daudin's bronzebackack
Dendrelaphis underwoodi  – Underwood's bronzeback
Dendrelaphis vogeli  – Vogel's bronzeback
Dendrelaphis walli  – Wall's bronzeback native to Myanmar
Dendrelaphis wickrorum  – Wickramasinghes’ bronzeback

Description
All species have a slender body with a long tail. Males are shorter in length and brighter in coloration; they also tend to be more active. Females are stouter with duller or darker colorations and are less active. Typical coloration includes red, brown, or orange on the head with bronze, brown, or olive-green running down the length of the back. The underside of the body is usually bright to pale green or yellow. They have big eyes and bright red tongues. The tail is fully prehensile.

Diet
The primary prey of Dendrelaphis species consists of lizards and frogs, but the larger species are capable of taking birds, bats, and small rodents.

References

Further reading
Boulenger GA (1894). Catalogue of the Snakes in the British Museum (Natural History). Volume II., Containing the Conclusion of the Colubridæ Aglyphæ. London: Trustees of the British Museum (Natural History). (Taylor and Francis, printers). xi + 382 pp. + Plates I-XX. (Genus Dendrelaphis, p. 87, Figure 7).

Wall F (1921). Ophidia Taprobanica or the Snakes of Ceylon. Colombo, Ceylon [Sri Lanka]: Colombo Museum. (H.R. Cottle, Government Printer). xxii + 581 pp. (Genus Dendrelaphis, pp. 220–221).

External links

Video of Dendrelaphis kopsteini in Malaysia

 
Colubrids
Snake genera
Snakes of Asia
Snakes of Southeast Asia
Reptiles of Oceania
Taxa named by George Albert Boulenger
Snakes of Australia